Luxembourg–Mexico relations are the diplomatic relations between the Grand Duchy of Luxembourg and the United Mexican States. Both nations are members of the OECD and the United Nations.

History
Diplomatic relations between Luxembourg and Mexico were established in 1947. In 1980, Luxembourgish Prime Minister Pierre Werner paid an official visit to Mexico and met with Mexican President José López Portillo. During his visit to Mexico, both nations discussed and emphasized the energetic cooperation, especially in the iron and steel industry, and Luxembourg's participation in the Las Truchas Steel Project in the Mexican state of Michoacán. In March 1991, Foreign Minister Jacques Poos paid a visit to Mexico. In April that same year, Mexican Foreign Minister Fernando Solana paid an official visit to Luxembourg, becoming the only high-level representative of the Mexican government to visit Luxembourg.

In March 1996, Grand Duke Jean of Luxembourg paid an official visit to Mexico. While in Mexico, Grand Duke Jean met with Mexican President Ernesto Zedillo and both leaders signed an Agreement on Air Services and both nations agreed for the establishment of a Consultation Mechanism for Mutual Interests. In December 1997, Mexico and the European Union signed an Economic Partnership, Political Coordination and Cooperation Agreement. During the negotiations, Luxembourg, as an EU member state, played a neutral role and did not put obstacles. However, the ratification of the Agreement was stopped by the Luxembourgish government during 1998 and most of 1999 due to a tax dispute. The situation was resolved with the signing of an Agreement on the Avoidance of Double Taxation in January 2000 by both nations.

In April 2019, Luxembourgish Prime Minister Xavier Bettel paid an official visit to Mexico where he met with President Andrés Manuel López Obrador. During the visit, both leaders agreed to deepen trade and investment exchanges between both nations. They also agreed on the importance of the modernization of the Global Agreement between Mexico and the European Union. Prime Minister Bettel also addressed the Mexican Senate and called on lawmakers to advance LGBT and women's rights in Mexico.

In February 2023, Mexican Foreign Undersecretary, Carmen Moreno Toscano, paid a visit to Luxembourg and met with her counterpart Jean Olinger. The two discussed opportunities to strengthen the bilateral relationship between both nations by establishing a mechanism for political consultations.

High-level visits

High-level visits from Luxembourg to Mexico
 Prime Minister Pierre Werner (1980)
 Minister of Foreign Trade Pierre Urbain (1990)
 Foreign Minister Jacques Poos (1991)
 Grand Duke Jean of Luxembourg (1996)
 Foreign Minister Lydie Polfer (2002)
 Minister of Finance Luc Frieden (2012)
 Prime Minister Xavier Bettel (2019)

High-level visits from Mexico to Luxembourg
 Foreign Minister Fernando Solana (1991)
 Foreign Undersecretary Carmen Moreno Toscano (2023)

Bilateral Agreements
Both nations have signed several bilateral agreements, such as an Agreement to Eliminate Visa Requirements for Ordinary Passport Holders (1975); Agreement on Economic Cooperation (1984); Agreement on Air Transportation (1996); Agreement for the Promotion and Reciprocal Protection of Investments (1998); Agreement on the Avoidance of Double Taxation (2000) and an Agreement for Cultural, Educational, Youth and Sports Cooperation (2006).

Trade
In 1997, Mexico signed a Free Trade Agreement with the European Union (which includes Luxembourg). In 2018, trade between Luxembourg and Mexico totaled US$170 million. Luxembourg's main exports to Mexico include: printed circuits; iron; steel; machinery and medicine. Mexico's main exports to Luxembourg include: Instruments and appliances for medicine, surgery, dentistry or veterinary; computers and parts; telephones and mobile phones; and polycarbonates.

There are 82 Luxembourgish companies operating in Mexico. In 2018, Luxembourg invested US$303 million in Mexico. Luxembourg steel company ArcelorMittal operates in Mexico. Luxembourgish company Cargolux also operates scheduled cargo-flights between both nations. Mexican multinational companies such as Alsea and Cemex operate in Luxembourg.

Diplomatic missions
 Luxembourg is accredited to Mexico from its embassy in Washington, D.C., United States and maintains an honorary consulate in Mérida.
 Mexico is accredited to Luxembourg from its embassy in Brussels, Belgium and maintains an honorary consulate in Luxembourg City.

References 

 
Mexico
Luxembourg